Jean-Baptiste Jeanin (22 January 1771 in Val-d'Épy – 2 May 1830) was a French military commander during the French Revolutionary Wars and Napoleonic Wars, and a brigadier general during the Peninsular War. During the Hundred Days he commanded the 20th Infantry Division at Ligny and Waterloo.

References
 Schneid, Frederick C. (2011). The French Revolutionary and Napoleonic Wars. Mainz: Institute of European History.
 Gates, David (1986). The Spanish Ulcer: A History of the Peninsular War. Pimlico 2002. 

1771 births
1830 deaths
French military personnel of the French Revolutionary Wars
French generals
French commanders of the Napoleonic Wars
People from Jura (department)
Names inscribed under the Arc de Triomphe